Joshua Smith (12 March 190522 July 1995) was an Australian artist who won the Archibald Prize in 1944 with his portrait of Hon Sol Rosevear, MP, Speaker of the Australian House of Representatives, but is better known as the subject of the previous year's controversial Archibald Prize win, Mr Joshua Smith by artist William Dobell.

Although the portrait of him was very popular, with more than 154,000 visitors, a court case relating to the portrait in 1943 damaged his career, as well as Dobell's. Garfield Barwick appeared for the plaintiff and, although the claim was dismissed, it made Barwick's reputation as a rising star of the legal fraternity. In an interview in 1991 Smith called the portrait a "curse, a phantom that haunts me. It has torn at me every day of my life. I've tried to bury it inside me in the hope it would die, but it never does". The portrait of him by Dobell had become more famous than his own work, which caused him considerable consternation.

References

External links 
Biography on Australia Online
The Best Australian Profiles, ed. Matthew Ricketson
 Trove

1905 births
1995 deaths
Australian portrait painters
Archibald Prize winners
Artists from Sydney
National Art School alumni
20th-century Australian painters
20th-century Australian male artists
Julian Ashton Art School alumni
Australian male painters